Khalimbekaul (Xalimbek-avul) is a rural locality (a selo) and the administrative centre of Khalimbekaulsky Selsoviet, Buynaksky District, Republic of Dagestan, Russia. The population was 5,108 as of 2010. There are 65 streets.

Geography 
Khalimbekaul is located 5 km northeast of Buynaksk (the district's administrative centre) by road, on the Shuraozen River. Kafyr-Kumukh and Buynaksk are the nearest rural localities.

References 

Rural localities in Buynaksky District